The Michigan–Michigan State men's ice hockey rivalry is a college ice hockey rivalry between Michigan Wolverines men's ice hockey and Michigan State Spartans men's ice hockey that is part of the larger intrastate rivalry between the University of Michigan and Michigan State University. It constitutes the most-played rivalry in college hockey. The rivalry between the Spartans and Wolverines notably includes football and basketball rivalries, although it extends to almost all sports and many other forms of achievement. The most notable examples of the hockey rivalry are two outdoor games, the October 6, 2001 Cold War in East Lansing and the December 11, 2010 Big Chill at the Big House in Ann Arbor, which set the world record for attendance at a hockey game. This record however was broken four years later at the 2014 NHL Winter Classic on January 1, 2014. As of 2013, both teams are members of the Big Ten Conference, although they have previously competed together in both the Central Collegiate Hockey Association (CCHA) and the Western Collegiate Hockey Association (WCHA).

Michigan currently leads the series, which began on January 11, 1922. The Wolverines lead 175–138–24, as of the end of the 2022-23 season. The regular home arenas for the teams are Yost Ice Arena (capacity 5,800) and Munn Ice Arena (capacity 6,470). The two schools play at least four times a year through conference play, and with regularity play a fifth game in the Great Lakes Invitational. It is possible for the teams to meet nine times throughout the season with regular season, GLI, Big Ten tournament and NCAA tournament games. The teams often play games on neutral sites and have played at least once per year since 1990 in Detroit, starting at Joe Louis Arena (capacity 20,066). The teams generally alternate years in which they hold a home game there. Beginning during the 2015–16 season, the winner of each game at Joe Louis Arena receives the Iron D Trophy. The last contest at "The Joe" was on February 10, 2017, as the contest will be held at the new Little Caesars Arena (capacity 19,515) from now on.

Since the Little Caesars Arena's hockey configuration capacity exceeds that of all regular collegiate hockey home venues as well as the Beanpot Tournament host venue, TD Garden, the annual game at LCA is among the most attended college hockey games each year, rivaled only by the Frozen Four.

An element of the rivalry is that Michigan (1964, 1992*, 1993* and 2018) and Michigan State (1999 and 2001) are the only two schools to have had both their hockey team and basketball team qualify for the Final Four of the NCAA Men's Ice Hockey Championship and NCAA Division I men's basketball tournament in the same season.

Duel in the D series
Michigan and Michigan State meet once a year in Detroit for a neutral site game. Michigan gets home team designation in even years, while Michigan State gets home team designation in odd years. Michigan leads the Duel in the D series 19–11–5. In 2016, the teams started competing for the Iron D trophy, Michigan has won the trophy five times, while Michigan State has won once.

Game results
Full game results for the rivalry, with rankings beginning in the 1995–96 season.

Notes

External links
 Official Big Chill at the Big House website

Michigan Michigan State
Big Ten Conference rivalries
Michigan Wolverines men's ice hockey
Michigan State Spartans ice hockey
1925 establishments in Michigan